Jean Van Leeuwen (born December 26, 1937) is the author of over forty children's books, including the Oliver Pig series, and Bound for Oregon. She studied journalism at Syracuse University and currently lives in Chappaqua, New York.

The Great Mouse Gang Series
From 1969 to the present, Jean has written five children's novels about a gang of three mice in New York City, led by the daredevil Marvin, who prefers to be called "Merciless Marvin the Magnificent". His two cohorts in adventure are the scholarly Raymond ("the Rat") and the sensitive, explosive-loving Fats ("the Fuse", although his birth name is revealed to be Dudley in the most recent story). Originally, the trio lived in the Bijou Theater, but Marvin led them in a semi-successful robbery of a cheese shop down the street, and they temporarily moved in there. At the start of the second story, they move into a dollhouse in the toy section of Macy's Department Store, and all subsequent adventures have either taken place or begun there. All titles of the gang's stories have been titled "The Great something-or-other", and take place in Manhattan(except for the fourth, which begins when the gang is accidentally sent to Vermont in a care package). In 1986, the first book was adapted into a Czechoslovakian animated film.

 The Great Cheese Conspiracy (1969)
 The Great Christmas Kidnaping Caper (1975)
 The Great Rescue Operation (1981)
 The Great Summer Camp Catastrophe (1992)
 The Great Googlestein (Guggenheim) Museum Mystery (2003)

Oliver and Amanda
 Tales of Oliver Pig (1979)
 More Tales of Oliver Pig (1981)
 Amanda Pig and Her Big Brother Oliver (1982)
 Tales of Amanda Pig (1983)
 More Tales of Amanda Pig (1985)
 Oliver, Amanda, and Grandmother Pig (1987)
 Oliver and Amanda's Christmas (1989)
 Oliver Pig at School (1990)
 Amanda Pig on Her Own (1991)
 Oliver and Amanda's Halloween (1992)
 Oliver and Amanda and the Big Snow (1995)
 Amanda Pig, Schoolgirl (1997)
 Amanda Pig and Her Best Friend Lollipop (1998)
 Oliver and Albert, Friends Forever (2000)
 Amanda Pig and The Awful Scary Monster (2003)
 Oliver the Mighty Pig (2004)
 Amanda Pig and the Really Hot Day (2005)
 Oliver Pig and the Best Fort Ever (2006)
 Amanda Pig, First Grader (2007)
 Amanda Pig and the Wiggly Tooth (2008)

References

External links
 

1937 births
American children's writers
American people of Dutch descent
American women novelists
20th-century American novelists
21st-century American novelists
Living people
American women children's writers
20th-century American women writers
21st-century American women writers